Francis Pierlot (July 15, 1875 – May 11, 1955) was a stage and film actor with over 90 film credits between 1914 and 1953.

The Massachusetts-born actor's first film credit was in 1914, but he did not begin appearing in films full-time until 1940, when he was 63 years old. He specialized in playing grey-haired well dressed characters in small parts including judges, priests and lawyers. One of Pierlot's larger roles was as Jean Simmons' manservant in his final film, the biblical epic The Robe (1953).

He died in Hollywood, California, at age 79. He was buried in Forest Lawn Memorial Park, Glendale, California.

Partial filmography

The Path Forbidden (1914) - Bug Hicks
The Night Angel (1931) - Jan
Escape to Glory (1940) - Professor Mudge
The Captain Is a Lady (1940) - Roger Bartlett
Strike Up the Band (1940) - Mr. Judd
Always a Bride (1940) - Pete Bond
Victory (1940) - McKenzie (uncredited)
The Trial of Mary Dugan (1941) - John Masters
Cracked Nuts (1941) - Mayor Wilfred Smun
International Lady (1941) - Dr. Rowan
Public Enemies (1941) - Priest
Rise and Shine (1941) - Prof. Schnauzer (uncredited)
Remember the Day (1941) - Mr. Steele
A Gentleman at Heart (1942) - Appleby
Yankee Doodle Dandy (1942) - Dr. Anderson (uncredited)
Just Off Broadway (1942) - Sidney Arno
Henry Aldrich, Editor (1942) - Nero Smith
Night Monster (1942) - Dr. Phipps
My Heart Belongs to Daddy (1942) - Dr. Mitchell
Edge of Darkness (1943) - Tailor (uncredited)
Mission to Moscow (1943) - Doctor (uncredited)
Stage Door Canteen (1943) - Minister at Jersey's Wedding (uncredited)
You're a Lucky Fellow, Mr. Smith (1943) - Doc Webster 
The North Star (1943) - Wounded Townsman (uncredited)
Mystery Broadcast (1943) - Crunch
Madame Curie (1943) - Monsieur Michaud (uncredited)
Uncertain Glory (1944) - Father La Borde - Prison Priest
The Adventures of Mark Twain (1944) - Paige (uncredited)
Bathing Beauty (1944) - Professor Hendricks
The Hairy Ape (1944) - Señor Cutler (uncredited)
The Doughgirls (1944) - Mr. Jordan
The Very Thought of You (1944) - Minister Raymond Houck
Grissly's Millions (1945) - Dr. Benny
Roughly Speaking (1945) - Dr. Lewis (uncredited)
A Tree Grows in Brooklyn (1945) - Priest at Funeral (uncredited)
The Affairs of Susan (1945) - Uncle Jemmy
The Horn Blows at Midnight (1945) - Heavenly Personnel Manager Mercurius (uncredited)
I Live in Grosvenor Square (1945) - Postman
Bewitched (1945) - Dr. George Wilton
The Hidden Eye (1945) - Kossovsky
Our Vines Have Tender Grapes (1945) - Minister
Yolanda and the Thief (1945) - Padre
Hit the Hay (1945) - Roger Barton
Life with Blondie (1945) - Simon Rutledge (uncredited)
How DOooo You Do (1945) - Proprietor
Fear (1946) - Prof. Stanley
Dragonwyck (1946) - Dr. Brown (uncredited)
The Catman of Paris (1946) - Paul Audet
The Walls Came Tumbling Down (1946) - Father Walsh (uncredited)
Two Guys from Milwaukee (1946) - Dr. Bauer
G.I. War Brides (1946) - Mr. Wunderlich
Crime Doctor's Man Hunt (1946) - Gerald Cotter
The Strange Woman (1946) - Dr. Bailey (uncredited)
The Show-Off (1946) - Judge Ederman (uncredited)
Cigarette Girl (1947) - Pervis
The Late George Apley (1947) - Wilson (uncredited)
 Philo Vance's Gamble (1947) - Roberts the Butler
Moss Rose (1947) - Train Conductor (uncredited)
The Trespasser (1947) - Channing Bliss, the Publisher
Second Chance (1947) - J.L. Montclaire
Song of Love (1947) - Old Musician (uncredited)
The Senator Was Indiscreet (1947) - Frank
Mr. Reckless (1948) - Rev. Stanislaus (uncredited)
State of the Union (1948) - Josephs - Newspaper Editor (uncredited)
I, Jane Doe (1948) - Father Martin
The Dude Goes West (1948) - Mr. Brittle
The Babe Ruth Story (1948) - Brother Peter (uncredited)
A Date with Judy (1948) - Professor Green (uncredited)
Beyond Glory (1948) - Mr. Charles—Rocky's Boss (uncredited)
The Loves of Carmen (1948) - Beggar (uncredited)
That Lady in Ermine (1948) - Priest (uncredited)
That Wonderful Urge (1948) - Barret (uncredited)
The Accused (1949) - Dr. Vinson
Chicken Every Sunday (1949) - Charlie Blaine (uncredited)
Bad Boy (1949) - Mr. Pardee (uncredited)
Take One False Step (1949) - Doctor Watson
My Friend Irma (1949) - Taxman (uncredited)
Undertow (1949) - Husband at Reno Bar (uncredited)
The Flame and the Arrow (1950) - Papa Pietro
Copper Canyon (1950) - Moss Balfour
Cyrano de Bergerac (1950) - Capuchin Monk
The Lemon Drop Kid (1951) - Henry Regan
That's My Boy (1951) - Henry Baker
Savage Drums (1951) - Aruna
Anne of the Indies (1951) - Herkimer
The Man with a Cloak (1951) - Pharmacist (uncredited)
Hoodlum Empire (1952) - Uncle Jean (uncredited)
Hold That Line (1952) - A.J. Billingsley
The Prisoner of Zenda (1952) - Josef
It Happens Every Thursday (1953) - Loomis (uncredited)
The Robe (1953) - Dodinius (uncredited)

External links

 
 

1875 births
1955 deaths
Male actors from Massachusetts
American male silent film actors
American male film actors
Burials at Forest Lawn Memorial Park (Glendale)
20th-century American male actors